Peter Alexander (born 1965) is an Australian fashion designer known for pyjamas, loungewear and giftware.

Early life
Peter Alexander was born in 1965 in South Africa and then moved to Australia shortly afterwards when he was a baby.

Alexander worked from his mother's dining room table during the early days of the Peter Alexander brand. He initially sold directly to department stores. When a store cancelled an order for 2,000 pairs of pyjamas in 1990, in desperation, he took out a mail order advertisement in Cleo magazine. Alexander received 6,000 orders from that one advertisement alone.

Peter Alexander the brand
In 2000, Peter Alexander joined Australian retailer Just Group, effectively selling his business although remaining creative director within the structure of the Just Group. After the sale, the brand Peter's PJs increased in popularity and the first stand-alone store was opened in Melbourne Central Melbourne Central Shopping Centre, shortly followed by Chadstone. He has since expanded the stores into every state of Australia.

Peter also speaks at conferences around Australia and internationally on the topics of entrepreneurship and marketing.

Personal life
Alexander lives in Melbourne. He is also a sessional lecturer in fashion marketing at RMIT. He is Jewish.

See also
Just Group - parent company of Peter Alexander Sleepwear

References

External links
 

1965 births
Living people
People from Melbourne
Australian fashion designers
Academic staff of RMIT University
Australian Jews
Australian company founders